"Dazzey Duks" is the debut single by Duice from their debut album, Dazzey Duks.

Background
The song was inspired by the short shorts worn by the character Daisy Duke on the CBS-TV series The Dukes of Hazzard.

Chart performance
The song peaked at No. 12 on the Billboard Hot 100, as well as reaching No. 16 on the Billboard Year-End Hot 100 singles of 1993. It was certified 2× platinum on January 27, 1994, by the RIAA.

Track listing
"Dazzey Duks" (Radio Version)
"Dazzey Duks" (Instrumental)
"Dazzey Duks" (Megga Bass Mix)
"Dazzey Duks" (Low Rider Mix)
"Dazzey Duks" (Ruffhouse Mix)

Charts

Peak positions

Year-end charts

References

1993 debut singles
Miami bass songs
1992 songs